The second series of New Zealand's Got Talent aired on TV One on 9 September 2012 and ended on 2 December 2012. The series was won by 15-year-old singer-songwriter Clara van Wel from Blenheim who performed her own song "Where Do You Find Love?". 11-year-old singer Jessie Hillel from Wellington was the runner-up, with 17-year-old singer-songwriter Evan Sinton from Auckland in third place.

Contestants competed for the grand prize of NZ$100,000 cash and a 2013 Toyota Corolla car. In addition, winner Clara van Wel was signed to Sony Music New Zealand, with a single of "Where Do You Find Love?" due to be released five days after she was announced the winner, and an album scheduled for February 2013.

In April 2013, Sony Music New Zealand released runner-up Jessie Hillel's full-length debut album With Love, which peaked at number three in the New Zealand Top 40 and number two in the New Zealand Top 20 charts.

Background 
In February 2012, Television New Zealand announced it was producing a version of New Zealand's Got Talent, which would screen later in the year on TV One. At the same time New Zealand broadcast funding agency NZ On Air committed to NZ$1.6 million of funding for the production of 14 episodes of 60 minutes each. New Zealand's Got Talent had last screened in 2008 on Prime.

Host and judges 

In April 2012, Breakfast weather presenter Tāmati Coffey was announced as the show's host and in June 2012 the show's three judges were named as supermodel Rachel Hunter, Opshop singer-songwriter Jason Kerrison and former UB40 lead singer Ali Campbell.

Auditions

The initial phase of open auditions was called the Toyota Talent Tour. In May and early June 2012, the show's producers toured around New Zealand towns and cities and held non-televised open auditions, where more than 5000 applicants auditioned. The audition locations were Invercargill, Dunedin, Timaru, Christchurch, Greymouth, Nelson, New Plymouth, Wellington, Napier, Hamilton, Rotorua, Tauranga, Whangarei and Auckland. The top 200 applicants then went through to the judges auditions.

Judges auditions 

The judges auditions took place in Dunedin at the Regent Theatre on 14 and 15 July, in Wellington at the St James Theatre on 21 and 22 July and in Auckland at the TelstraClear Pacific Events Centre on 25–28 July. The first episode aired on 9 September, starting five weeks of audition episodes which included footage from all three audition locations. After the judges auditions, the successful contestants were further reduced down to a group of 30 for the semi-finals.

Semi-finals

There were six semi-finals, with the first episode broadcast on 14 October. The semi-finals were pre-recorded the Wednesday before broadcast at the City Impact Church in Albany, Auckland. The winners of each week's semi-final were revealed at the beginning of the next week's episode.

Three semi-finalists had also appeared in the semi-finals of the first series of New Zealand's Got Talent in 2008: Andre Vegas and Company, Dogmatic (as Chelsea and Quest) and the All Star Cheerleaders (with a different line-up).

Wildcard 

In addition to the 30 semi-finalists, one wildcard entry was chosen by a public competition. The Head & Shoulders Above the Rest competition was open to any act who had previously auditioned. Acts uploaded a video to the Above the Rest website and were voted on by the public. The top five contestants then performed for the judges, who chose singing act Arihia and Tahu to join the line-up of semi-final 6.

Semi-finalists

Semi-final summary

First Semi-Final, Week 1 (14 October)

Second Semi-Final, Week 2 (21 October)
 Guest performer: Annah Mac - "Bucket"

Third Semi-Final, Week 3 (28 October)
 Guest performer: Opshop - "Never Leave Me Again"

Fourth Semi-Final, Week 4 (4 November)

Fifth Semi-Final, Week 5 (11 November)
 Guest performer: Justice Crew - "Boom Boom"

Sixth Semi-Final, Week 6 (18 November)
 Guest performer: Delta Goodrem - "Wish You Were Here"

Grand Final, Week 7 (25 November-2 December) 

The two-hour grand final was broadcast on 25 November with the results show on 2 December.
 Guest performers:
 Dane Rumble - "Tonight"
 Ali Campbell - "Maybe Tomorrow"
 Tāmati Coffey and dancers - "Gangnam Style"
 Evermore - "Follow the Sun"
 Contestant performances:
 Rejected auditionees medley: Billy's Big Brass Band (one-man band), Ji-Ye (comedic singer), Ocean Waitokia (yodeller), Russell Gray (dancer), Top Shop (One Direction parody)
 Clara, Evan and Jessie - "Somebody That I Used to Know"

Ratings

The series consistently rated well, being the most watched show on New Zealand television every week. At the series end, TVNZ revealed it had been the most watched show on New Zealand television in 10 years.

References

External links 
 Official site
 New Zealand's Got Talent on Facebook

2012 New Zealand television seasons